Oscar Beregi Jr. (May 12, 1918 – November 1, 1976) was a Hungarian-born film and television actor. He was the son of actor Oscar Beregi Sr. and often was billed simply as Oscar Beregi. Beregi was most famous for his roles in The Twilight Zone.

Career

Television
Beregi had a major recurring role as gangster Joe Kulak on The Untouchables. He played the starring role as former Nazi Gunther Lutze in the Twilight Zone episode "Deaths-Head Revisited." He also appeared in the Twilight Zone episodes "The Rip Van Winkle Caper" and "Mute". He also appeared in other television shows, including Hogan's Heroes (twice), The Monkees, The Man From U.N.C.L.E., Blue Light, Don't Call Me Charlie!, The Wild Wild West, Batman, Mission: Impossible, Get Smart, Green Acres, Bat Masterson (as a magician), and in an episode of The Lucy Show which featured Hogan's Heroes stars Bob Crane and John Banner. He appeared in the Gomer Pyle, U.S.M.C. episode "Love and Goulash", which aired on March 29, 1968.

Film
Beregi's film career included small roles in several major films, including Judgment at Nuremberg (1961), The Incredible Mr. Limpet (1964), My Fair Lady (1964), Ship of Fools (1965), Everything You Always Wanted to Know About Sex* (*But Were Afraid to Ask) (1972) and Young Frankenstein (1974).

Death
Beregi died of a heart attack on November 1, 1976, in Los Angeles, California. He was buried in the Grand View Memorial Park Cemetery in Glendale.

Filmography

References

External links
 
 

American male film actors
American male television actors
Hungarian emigrants to the United States
1918 births
1976 deaths
20th-century American male actors
Male actors from Budapest
Burials at Grand View Memorial Park Cemetery